Kurugapuram is a small village near Thisayanvilai panchayat town in the Indian state of Tamil Nadu.

Introduction
Kurugapuram is a small village near Thisayanvilai.

Pincode
Pincode of Kurugapuram 627 657 under Radhapuram Taluk. The same pincode also used for other villages including Mannarpuram, Kalikumarapuram, Kumarapuram, Mahadevankulam, Muthukrishnapuram, Navaladi, Samaria and Thisayanvilai.

References

Villages in Tirunelveli district